Yuliian Yakovych Pankevych, sometimes Yulian Pankevych (Ukrainian: Юліян Якович Паньке́вич: (4 July 1863, Ustia-Zelenye, Chortkiv Raion — 1933, Kharkiv) was a Ukrainian painter, writer and activist. Sometimes, he went by the pseudonym, Простен Добромисл (roughly, "simple peasant"). He often gave free art lessons to children. He was also a talented violinist and singer and organized choral societies in small villages.

Biography 
His father, Yakiv, was a church painter. He spent much of his childhood in Yezupil. In 1884, he graduated from the gymnasium in Berezhany. With financial assistance from the Dzieduszycki family, he was able to study at the Kraków Academy of Fine Arts under the direction of Jan Matejko. From 1885 to 1887, he continued his studies in Vienna.

From 1892 to 1898, he worked in Stanyslaviv (now Ivano-Frankivsk) and the villages of Prykarpattia, where he organized choruses, gave art lessons, painted churches and gathered folklore. He organized several exhibitions; in 1898, 1900 and 1903. One of his students during this period was Mykhailo Boychuk, who would be executed during the Great Purge.

The following year, he painted the only portrait of Franko done from life, as well as a portrait of Taras Shevchenko.

In 1918, he illustrated Баронський син в Америці (The Baroness' Son in America), a collection of fairy tales by Volodymyr Hnatiuk. Through his recommendation, Pankevych also did illustrations for works by Hnat Khotkevych. He was, himself, the author of satirical couplets, fairy tales, stories and newspaper articles.

In 1932, he accepted a position at the Fine Arts Museum Kharkiv. He died there in the summer of 1933, during the Holodomor famine. At the time, he was already ill and some sources indicate that he committed suicide.

Since 1993, there has been a small museum, named in his honor, at the gymnasium in Ustia-Zelenye.

References

Sources 
 Панькевич Юліян // Encyclopedia of Ukraine. V. 5. P. 1938. ukr.

Further reading 
 Y.V. Nanovsky. Юліан Панькевич: Нарис про життя і творчість (Julian Pankevich: An Essay on Life and Creativity), 1986 Online @ the Ukrainian Art Library.

External links 

An appreciation @ the Ukrainian Art Library
Brief Biography @ the Ukrainian Knowledge Society
Brief Biography @ Art Lviv Online

1863 births
1933 deaths
Ukrainian painters
Ukrainian male painters
Religious painters
Ukrainian illustrators